Nikita is a common name in Eastern Europe and Greece. The Russian variant originated as a Greek name, and subsequently Russian name. The Ukrainian and Belarusian  variants are  Mykyta, and Mikita, respectively (but  Nikita is also in use in  both countries). The Romanian variant is Nichita. The name is derived from the Greek Nicetas (meaning 'victor'). The Greek name entered Slavic onomastics by way of the veneration of  Saint Nicetas the Goth (died 372) in the Russian Orthodox Church.

The Indian feminine name Niketā निकेता,  Nikitā निकिता is unrelated. It comes from a Sanskrit  word nikita  निकेत, niketana निकेतन meaning "house, habitation; temple"

People with the given name Nikita

Slavic name 
Prince Nikita Alexandrovich of Russia (1900–1974), Russian prince and monarchist in exile
Nikita Alekseev (born 1993), Ukrainian singer-songwriter
Nikita Alexeev (born 1981), Russian ice hockey player
Nikita Dragun (born 1996), American Internet personality, make-up artist, and model
Nikita Filatov (born 1990), Russian ice hockey player
Nikita Howarth (born 1998), New Zealand para swimmer
Nikita Katsalapov (born 1991), Russian ice dancer
Nikita Khrushchev (1894–1971), Soviet leader
Nikita Koloff (born 1959), American wrestler
Nikita Krylov (born 1992), Ukrainian  mixed martial arts fighter
Nikita Kucherov (born 1993), Russian ice hockey player
Nikita Kuzmin (born 1997), Ukrainian dancer
Nikita Mazepin (born 1999), Russian Formula 1 driver
Nikita Mikhalkov (born 1945), Russian filmmaker and actor
Nikita Nagornyy (born 1997), Russian artistic gymnast
Nikita Nikitin (born 1986), Russian ice hockey player
Nikita Odnoralov Russian musician, lead singer of the band Everfound
Nikita Rochev (born 1992), Belarusian professional footballer
Prince Nikita Romanov (1923–2007), son of Prince Nikita Alexandrovich
Nikita Sakharov (1915–1945), Soviet Evenk poet
Nikita Scherbak (born 1995), Russian ice hockey player
Nikita Simonyan (born 1926), Soviet footballer of Armenian descent
Nikita Tryamkin (born 1994), Russian ice hockey player
Nikita Soshnikov (born 1992), Russian ice hockey player
Nikita Rukavytsya (born 1987), Australian football (soccer) player

Indian name 
Nikita Anand (born 1983), Indian model
Nikita Thukral (born 1981), South Indian actress
Nikita Mirzani (born 1986), Indonesian actress
Nikhita Gandhi (born 1991), Indian playback singer
Nikita Willy (born 1994), Indonesian actress and pop singer
Nikita Gill, British-Indian poet
Nikkita Holder, Canadian track and field athlete

Other 
Nikita Parris (born 1994), English football (soccer) player

Pseudonyms 
Nikita, former ring name of Katarina Waters, British professional wrestler

Fictional characters 
Nikita the Tanner, character in East Slavic folklore
Nikita, the main character in the 1990 action thriller film La Femme Nikita, 
The main character in the television series La Femme Nikita, adapted from the above film
Nikita Mears, the main character in the television series Nikita, adapted from the above film
Nikita Dragovich, the main antagonist in Call of Duty: Black Ops
Nikki is the shortened version of Nikita, the name of the fourth child of the Singh family in Best of Luck Nikki, the Indian adaptation of Disney's American sitcom Good Luck Charlie.

See also 
Nikita (disambiguation)
Nichita
Nechita
Mykyta
Mikita
Nikica
Nicodemus

References 

Russian masculine given names
Ukrainian masculine given names
Bulgarian masculine given names
Macedonian masculine given names
French feminine given names
Indian feminine given names